Svetlana Novikova (born 5 September 1974) is a Russian alpine skier. She competed in two events at the 1992 Winter Olympics, representing the Unified Team.

References

1974 births
Living people
Russian female alpine skiers
Olympic alpine skiers of the Unified Team
Alpine skiers at the 1992 Winter Olympics
People from Yelizovo